Underground resistance may refer to:

 Underground Resistance (band), a musical collective from Detroit, Michigan, United States
 Underground resistance during World War II, the inhabitants of various locales resisting the rule of the Nazis, the Empire of Japan, and Mussolini
 Resistance movement, a group opposing an occupier or state by violent or nonviolent means
 The Underground Resistance, 2013 album by Darkthrone